Cold start can refer to:

Cold start (automotive), the starting of a vehicle engine at a low temperature relative to its operating temperature.
Cold start (computing), a startup problem in computer information systems.
Cold Start (military doctrine), a military doctrine developed by the Indian Armed Forces.
Cold start (recommender systems), the problem of recommending items to users with insufficient data

See also 
 Cold open, a narrative technique used in television and films